The Thathera is a Hindu and Sikh artisan caste in India, who traditional occupation is the making of brass and copper utensils. In 2014, the craft of the Thathera community of Jandiala Guru were included in UNESCO’s List of Intangible Cultural Heritage.

Present circumstances 
The Thathera community are divided into 47 clans. The main ones are Chauhan, Parmar, Gohil, Mahecha Rathod, Vadher, Solanki, Bhatti, khasi, Kagda and Puvar . In Uttar Pradesh, they are found mainly in Lalitpur, Jalaun, Banda, Kanpur, Lucknow, Mirzapur and  Indore M.p also In Bihar, they are found in the districts of Patna, Nalanda, Gaya, Nawada, Bhagalpur, Muzaffarpur, Munger, Purnea, Begusarai, Katihar, Khagaria, and Madhubani. The Bihar Thathera are divided into a number of exogamous clans such as the Chandrahar, Chaswar, Mirdang, Amarpallo, and Peswa.
 
The Thathera are basically a community of artisans. Metal work, business and repair of utensils are their traditional occupations. Many of them even cultivate land, and in Bihar, many are also jewellers. In Odisha, they are called 'kansari' and the main ones of this community are the Maharana and the Mahapatra. Basically, they are involved with metal artisan works like 'brass', 'bronze', 'aluminium' and 'copper' etc.

In Rajasthan 

The Thathera in Rajasthan are found in the districts Jodhpur, Alwar, Jaipur, Madhopur, Jaiselmer, Ajmer, Bikaner, Ujjain, Udaipur, Banswara and Dungarpur. They speak Khari Boli and wagri among themselves, and Rajasthani with outsiders.

In Haryana 

In Haryana, the Thathera claim to have been Rajput, who abandoned their traditional occupation and started to manufacture silver and gold coins. They immigrated from Rajasthan in the 19th Century and settled initially in Rewari. The community then took to manufacturing utensils. A small number of Thathera who are found in the town of Jagadhari, are said to have immigrated from Pakistan. The Haryana Thathera have fifty two clans. Their main clans are the Barawashli, Anant, Godomot and Ramgarhia. The community is strictly endogamous.

In Bihar 
In Bihar, the Thatheras are classified as a Backward Caste.

UNESCO Listing and Government Programs 
Although people of the Thathera community reside across the country, only those from Jandiala Guru in the state of Punjab were included in the UNESCO's List of Intangible Cultural Heritage. 

After years of neglect and inaction on the part of the government and the civil society, the UNESCO listing prompted the Deputy Commissioner of Amritsar to collaborate with students of Shri Ram College of Commerce to revive the dying craft form. Soon, Navjot Singh Sidhu, the then Minister of Tourism of Punjab pledged Rs. 10 lakhs to this effort, under the umbrella of Project Virasat.

Names

Other names of the community include:

 Hindi-Thathera/Tamrakar/Tamera/Vadhera/hayaran, Tamta (Uttrakhand)
 Gujarati-Kansara
 Nepali-tamo/tamot/tamrakar,
 Punjabi-thatheri/thathiyar,
 Bangla-karmakar,
 Marathi-twastha tambat kasar

References 

Social groups of Uttar Pradesh
Indian castes
Social groups of Rajasthan
Social groups of Bihar
Social groups of Haryana